The MotoCoaster is a motorbike roller coaster at Six Flags Darien Lake in Darien, New York. It was the park's first launch coaster, and was the first MotoCoaster by Zamperla to be installed in the United States, though the Pony Express, a similar type of coaster with horse themed trains, was constructed around the same time and is currently operating at Knott's Berry Farm.

Darien Lake partnered with Orange County Choppers for naming rights for the coaster, along with a promotional giveaway of a custom painted OCC motorcycle, and a custom built bike to remain at the park.

The coaster installed at Darien Lake is actually the prototype coaster that was used for tuning and testing at Zamperla's factory in Italy.

The coaster was originally named the Orange County Choppers Motocoaster (OCC Motocoaster) when it first opened in 2008. However, the name was changed to the Moto Coaster in 2010 after the naming rights with Orange County Choppers expired.

References

External links
Darien Lake Official Website
Zamperla Rides

Six Flags Darien Lake
Roller coasters in New York (state)
Roller coasters introduced in 2008
Roller coasters operated by Herschend Family Entertainment